Regino García y Basa (11 June 1840 – 16 July 1916) was a Filipino artist, botanist and forester. He was also a printing instructor at the University of Santo Tomas and director of walks, gardens and parks for Manila. He is noted for being one of the botanical illustrators who produced plates for Francisco Manuel Blanco's Flora de Filipinas, the illustrated version of which was published in Manila between 1877 and 1883.

References

1840 births
1916 deaths
Botanical illustrators
19th-century Filipino painters
20th-century Filipino painters